Bill Ritchie (1 August 1931 – 25 January 2010) was a Scottish cartoonist. He is known for work on comics published by D. C. Thomson.

Biography
Born in Glasgow, Ritchie attended the Glasgow School of Art, where he learnt little about cartoons or comics; instead, he taught himself by practising from local comics artists Jack Lindsay, Bud Neill, Jimmy Malcolm, Harry Smith and Bill Tait. It was Malcolm who suggested he try to draw comics for D. C. Thomson in Dundee. While serving in the army in Korea, he submitted his first cartoons to the publisher, which were printed in The Weekly News.

His first comic strip was Clumsy Claude in The Beano, and for many years he drew Baby Crockett in the Beezer. Between 1957 and 1964 Ritchie drew the illustrations for "The Glad Mag" an annual magazine produced by students of Queen's College, Dundee as part of their charities campaign. Copies of these magazines are held by University of Dundee Archive Services.

After his retirement in the 1990s, his comics were "ghosted" by other artists.

He died on 25 January 2010.

Bibliography
Comics work includes:
 Baby Crockett in the Beezer
 Barney Bulldog in Sparky – the third cover strip, similar to Biffo the Bear
 Clumsy Claude in The Beano
 Dicky Burd in the Beezer
 Hungry Hoss in Beezer – an ever-hungry horse, owned by Joe the cowboy robber
 Smiffy in the Beezer
 Supporting Life in Plug
 Sweet Sue in The Beano – running from 1978 to 1980, the strip featured Sue, a sweet and inoffensive young girl who always got the better of school bullies Harriet and Mabel. She had a dog called William.
 The Moonsters in Sparky
 Toots in Bunty

Notes

References

Interview in Psychopia
Encyclopedia of Comic Characters by Denis Gifford, 1987. 
Bimbo page at Britishcomics.com
Sparky page at Britishcomics.com
The Beezer's Golden Years – Bill Ritchie tribute

External links

Bill Ritchie on Lambiek Comiclopedia

1931 births
2010 deaths
Alumni of the Glasgow School of Art
Artists from Glasgow
Scottish cartoonists
The Beano people